Haywoode (Sidney Haywoode, London) is an English female singer. She is best known for the 1986 UK top 20 hit single, "Roses". She later also recorded under the name Sid Haywoode.

Career
Haywoode trained from an early age at London's Corona Stage Academy.

Her career started with modelling, dancing and acting roles in British television shows like The Gentle Touch and was a regular as a Hill's Angel on The Benny Hill Show. She featured in movies including Ragtime and  Superman.

Among singing, dancing and modelling roles in the West End theatre (Bubbling Brown Sugar), she joined Flick Colby's Zoo, as a professional dancer performing weekly on BBC One's Top of the Pops.
She was approached a year later to record a demo by Sony CBS Records offering a deal.

Her debut single, "A Time Like This", reached the Top 5 in the US Hot Dance Club Play Chart, and established her distinctive brand of soulful funk/pop. Via a succession of singles – including some tracks produced by Stock, Aitken & Waterman, "You'd Better Not Fool Around" and "Getting Closer", later covered by Kylie Minogue. In July 1986 with the song "Roses" she hit the top 20 in the UK music charts. Her debut album Arrival (released soon after "Roses") included Haywoode's cover version of Prince's "I Wanna Be Your Lover".

The Arrival album was being sold online (Amazon Japan) for $800 so in February 2010 Cherry Red's Cherry Pop label released a digitally-remastered Arrival – Special Edition, featuring seven bonus tracks and in-depth 'making of' article with four new interviews with those involved in its creation (producers Phil Harding and Bruce Nazarian, CBS Executive Steve Ripley and Haywoode).

In 2011 Haywoode released an album named Bounce Back, collaborating with different producers in Australia, Netherlands, Italy and United States.

In the summer of 2012, she created a music production company "Wonderlick Productions" with her writing partner and music producer Soundsinsane.
The song Excuses reached No. 6 on Euro Solution's Independent Hi Energy Dance Chart in UK with the remix of Excuses Produced by Soundsinsane/Haywoode and remix by JRMX in UK.

2018 saw her first single release "Roses 2018" enter charts worldwide including No. 5 Greece, No. 25 on the iTunes Dance Chart. Another Cherry Pop compilation – Roses, Remixes & Rarities was released bringing together many sought-after mixes of her classic 80s singles plus B-sides, rarities and unheard recordings from throughout her CBS tenure.

2019 Haywoode released "Look My Way" a Stock Aiken Waterman song which was originally written for her and later recorded and released on Kylie Minogue's first album.

Discography

Albums

Singles

References

External links
 Discography at Discogs.
 Discography at Musicbrainz.

Year of birth missing (living people)
Living people
English dance musicians
Singers from London
English women pop singers